Elise Mertens and Aryna Sabalenka defeated Barbora Krejčíková and Kateřina Siniaková in the final, 6–3, 6–2, to win the women's doubles tennis title at the 2019 Indian Wells Masters.

Hsieh Su-wei and Barbora Strýcová were the defending champions, but they lost in the quarterfinals to Chan Hao-ching and Latisha Chan.

Seeds

Draw

Finals

Top half

Bottom half

References
General

 2019 Indian Wells Masters – Women's Doubles draw and results at the Women's Tennis Association

Specific

BNP Paribas Open – Women's Doubles
2019 BNP Paribas Open